Budowlani Łódź, is the women's volleyball department of Polish sports club Budowlani Łódź based in the city of Łódź and plays in the Liga Siatkówki Kobiet.

Previous names
Due to sponsorship, the club have competed under the following names:
 Organika Budowlani Łódź (2006–2011)
 Budowlani Łódź (2011–2013)
 Beef Master Budowlani Łódź (2013–2014)
 Budowlani Łódź (2014–2016)
 Grot Budowlani Łódź (2016–present)

History
Budowlani Łódź a sports club based in Łódź, first created a volleyball department in the 1970s, with the team reaching the division II at best. The club decided to focus on other sports and in the 1980s dissolved the volleyball department. Two decades later, in 2005 the club set up a project to relaunch its volleyball department with the goal of reaching the Polish highest league in 3 years. The team was created for the 2006–07 season and started playing in the third division. A season later it competed in the second division, reaching the first division in 2009. The club won its first major title by claiming the 2009–10 Polish Cup.

Since 2010 the club has also participated in European competitions.

Honours

National competitions
  Polish Women's Volleyball League
 Runners-up (1): 2017

  Polish Cup
 Winners(2x): 2010, 2018
 Runners-up (1): 2017

  Polish Super Cup 
 Winners (2): 2017, 2018
 Runners-up (1): 2010

Team
Season 2018–2019, as of November 2018.

Notable players

References

External links

Official website 

Volleyball clubs established in 2006
2006 establishments in Poland
Women's volleyball teams in Poland
Sport in Łódź